Solo Tape is the first solo album by Lord Infamous, although it was originally released as an untitled cassette, it later becoming known as “Lord of Terror” erroneously via bootlegs & collectors tape trading mixtape. It was recorded 1993. Many of the songs on Lord of Terror were reprised or samples were used in later Three 6 Mafia albums.

Track listing
 "Beat Down" (featuring DJ Paul) (Original Version)
 "South Memphis"
 "Lick My Nutts" (Original Version)
 "Gotta Make a Stang" (featuring DJ Paul)
 "Bitches Ain't Worth It (Skit)" (featuring Juicy J, Lil Buck, and DJ Paul)
 "9mm" (featuring Juicy J)
 "Murder On the Menu"
 "Y'all Ready For This" (Original Version)
 "Drag 'Em From the River" (featuring DJ Paul)
 "Scarecrow"
 "Dedication"
 "Where Is Da Bud?, Part 1" 
 "Where Is Da Bud?, Part 2"

References

1995 debut albums
Lord Infamous albums